The Milwaukee Brewers' 2000 season involved the Brewers' finishing 3rd in the National League Central with a record of 73 wins and 89 losses.

Offseason
 November 19, 1999: Jason Bere was signed as a free agent by the Brewers.
 December 13, 1999: Matt Williams was drafted by the Brewers from the New York Yankees in the rule 5 draft. Williams was returned to the Yankees on May 3.
 January 14, 2000: Alex Ochoa was traded by the Brewers to the Cincinnati Reds for Mark Sweeney and a player to be named later. The Reds completed the deal by sending Gene Altman (minors) to the Brewers on May 15.
 January 21, 2000: Bill Pulsipher was traded by the Brewers to the New York Mets for Luis López.

Regular season

Opening Day starters
Kevin Barker
Ronnie Belliard
Henry Blanco
Jeromy Burnitz
Marquis Grissom
Jimmy Haynes
José Hernández
Geoff Jenkins
Mark Loretta

Season standings

Record vs. opponents

Notable transactions
 March 22, 2000: Charlie Hayes was signed as a free agent by the Brewers.
 June 2, 2000: Héctor Ramírez was released by the Brewers.
 July 28, 2000: Bob Wickman, Jason Bere and Steve Woodard were traded by the Brewers to the Cleveland Indians for Paul Rigdon, Richie Sexson, Kane Davis and a player to be named later. The Indians completed the deal by sending Marco Scutaro to the Brewers on August 30.

Roster

Player stats

Batting

Starters by position
Note: Pos = Position; G = Games played; AB = At bats; H = Hits; Avg. = Batting average; HR = Home runs; RBI = Runs batted in

Other batters
Note: G = Games played; AB = At bats; H = Hits; Avg. = Batting average; HR = Home runs; RBI = Runs batted in

Pitching

Starting pitchers 
Note: G = Games pitched; IP = Innings pitched; W = Wins; L = Losses; ERA = Earned run average; SO = Strikeouts

Other pitchers 
Note: G = Games pitched; IP = Innings pitched; W = Wins; L = Losses; ERA = Earned run average; SO = Strikeouts

Relief pitchers 
Note: G = Games pitched; W = Wins; L = Losses; SV = Saves; ERA = Earned run average; SO = Strikeouts

Farm system

The Brewers' farm system consisted of eight minor league affiliates in 2000. The Brewers operated a Venezuelan Summer League team as a co-op with the Boston Red Sox and Minnesota Twins. The Indianapolis Indians won the International League championship.

References

2000 Milwaukee Brewers team at Baseball-Reference
2000 Milwaukee Brewers team page at baseball-almanac.com

Milwaukee Brewers seasons
Milwaukee Brew
Milwaukee Brewers